Dejan Georgievski (born 8 May 1999) is a Macedonian professional taekwondo practitioner who  represents North Macedonia internationally in the World Taekwondo Tournaments in the men's heavyweight (+87 kg) class. He is an Olympic silver medalist in the men's +80 kg event at the 2020 Summer Olympics in Tokyo.

Career
In 2018 Georgievski won the silver medal in the men's +80 kg taekwondo competition at the XVIIIth Mediterranean Games.

Besides the Mediterranean Games, he won numerous medals in international competitions including the European Olympic Qualification Tournament, the President's Cup, the Sofia Open, the Turkish Open, the Greece Open, Galeb Belgrade Trophy (Serbia Open), the Slovenia Open and more.

Georgievski is currently ranked 25th in the World Taekwondo heavyweight (+87 kg) rankings and 39th in the +80 kg Olympic weight class.

2020 Summer Olympics
Georgievski qualified for the 2020 Summer Olympics in the men's +80 kg by beating 2016 Olympic champion Radik Isayev of Azerbaijan 13-6 at the European Olympic Qualification Tournament in Sofia. At the Olympics in Tokyo, Georgievski won reigning world champion Rafael Alba of Cuba 11-8 in the round of 16 and captured the silver medal by beating two-time Asian champion In Kyo-don of South Korea 12-6 in the semifinals.

He won one of the bronze medals in the men's +80 kg event at the 2022 Mediterranean Games held in Oran, Algeria.

Tournament record

References

External links
 

Living people
Sportspeople from Skopje
1999 births
Place of birth missing (living people)
Macedonian male taekwondo practitioners
Competitors at the 2018 Mediterranean Games
Competitors at the 2022 Mediterranean Games
Mediterranean Games bronze medalists for North Macedonia
Mediterranean Games medalists in taekwondo
Taekwondo practitioners at the 2020 Summer Olympics
Olympic silver medalists for North Macedonia
Medalists at the 2020 Summer Olympics
Olympic medalists in taekwondo
Olympic taekwondo practitioners of North Macedonia